Lívia Regina Sórgia de Andrade (born 20 June 1983) is a Brazilian television presenter, actress, model, dancer, radio personality, and businesswoman. 

She gained prominence for her participation in the Programa Silvio Santos from 2008 to 2020. As an actress, she played various roles in the comedy sketch show A Praça é Nossa, starred in the television special 30 Anos de Chaves and telenovelas Corações Feridos and Carrossel.

Early life
Andrade was born and raised in Casa Verde, São Paulo, Brazil. Her father was a business administrator who died when she was a child and her mother is a banker. She has a brother.

Andrade has a degree in Radio and TV.

Career

Career beginnings
Andrade started her career at age of 9 or 10 as a runway and advertising model. In 1997, she made her television debut on the SBT game show Fantasia as a Fantasia Girl dancer. In 1998, she joined the "Mallandrinhas" group of dancers in the comedy show Festa do Mallandro, hosted by Sérgio Mallandro. With the group she also appeared in various segments, such as sketches and pranks, and sang for two funk carioca albums.

When Andrade was 18, she posed nude for the September 2001 issue of  Playboy. Around this time she traveled to Israel for modeling. In 2003, she posed nude for the August issue of Sexy.

Andrade was an owner of a clothing store. In 2008, Andrade founded Santa Sereia, a religious goods store.

Queen of the drums
Andrade came to wider attention for decades as a queen of the drums of samba schools.

Filmography

Television

As host

Film

Discography

Albums

Soundtrack albums

Theater

Radio

References

External links

 
 

1983 births
Living people